Filippo de Monti (died 1680) was a Roman Catholic prelate who served as Bishop of Ascoli Piceno (1670–1680) and Bishop of Teramo (1666–1670).

Biography
Filippo de Monti was born in Fermo, Italy.
On 11 Jan 1666, he was appointed during the papacy of Pope Alexander VII as Bishop of Teramo.
On 17 Jan 1666, he was consecrated bishop by Marcantonio Franciotti, Cardinal-Priest of Santa Maria della Pace. 
On 2 Jun 1670, he was appointed during the papacy of Pope Clement X as Bishop of Ascoli Piceno.
He served as Bishop of Ascoli Piceno until his death on 24 Dec 1680.

References

External links and additional sources
 (for Chronology of Bishops)
 (for Chronology of Bishops)
 (for Chronology of Bishops)
 (for Chronology of Bishops)

17th-century Italian Roman Catholic bishops
Bishops appointed by Pope Alexander VII
Bishops appointed by Pope Clement X
1680 deaths